Mary Wells Lawrence (born Mary Georgene Berg on May 25, 1928) is an American retired advertising executive. She was the founding president of Wells, Rich, Greene,  an advertising agency known for its creative work. Lawrence was the first female CEO of a company listed on the New York Stock Exchange. Mary Wells Lawrence was awarded the Lion of St. Mark for her lifetime achievements at the 2020 Cannes Lions Festival of Creativity.

Education and early years
Lawrence was born in Youngstown, Ohio, United States. In the late 1940s, she studied for two years at the Carnegie Institute of Technology in Pittsburgh, Pennsylvania, where she met industrial design student Burt Wells.  While there she became a member of Kappa Alpha Theta.  In 1949, they married and moved to Youngstown, Ohio. She began her advertising career there in 1951, as a copywriter for McKelvey's department store. She relocated to New York City, where she studied theatre and drama. By 1952, she had become Macy's fashion advertising manager. She divorced Wells that year, only to remarry him in 1954. Lawrence worked as a copywriter and copy group head at McCann Erickson in 1953, later joining the Lennen & Newell advertising agency's "brain trust." In 1957, she began a seven-year tenure at Doyle Dane Bernbach (now DDB Worldwide). In her 2002 book, A Big Life in Advertising, Lawrence cited DDB partners James Edwin Doyle, Maxwell Dane, and William Bernbach as significant influences on her subsequent career.

Family
Lawrence had two daughters with Bert Wells, Pamela and Kathy.  She divorced Bert a second time in 1965, and married former Braniff International Airways president Harding Lawrence on November 25, 1967.  Mr. Lawrence had four children: sons Harding, Jr., who died in infancy, James B., State R.,and one daughter, Deborah. He died on February 16, 2002, at age 81 of pancreatic cancer.

Jack Tinker and Partners and Braniff
Lawrence went to work for Jack Tinker and his new advertising group, Jack Tinker and Partners.  The members of this revolutionary new think tank were dubbed "Tinker's Thinkers".  The "Thinkers" would create ad campaigns for other agencies at Interpublic, a holding company of many US advertising firms. Lawrence had previously worked for Tinker at McCann-Erickson, and was excited to partner with him again. Her star rose in the advertising world  with the success of her advertising campaign for Braniff International Airways, "The End of the Plain Plane". She hired Alexander Girard as project designer, and designer Emilio Pucci to create new uniforms for the airline's flight attendants and crew. The campaign was lauded as critical to the airline's revolutionary turnaround.

Wells Rich Greene
Following the success of the Braniff campaign, and due to being denied a promotion promised to her, Lawrence founded Wells Rich Greene on April 5, 1966, and became the agency's president. Partner Richard Rich acted as the agency's treasurer, and Stewart Greene its secretary. Major WRG clients included American Motors, Cadbury Schweppes, IBM, MCI Communications, Pan American World Airways, Trans World Airlines, Procter & Gamble, Ralston Purina, RC Cola, and Sheraton Hotels and Resorts. Braniff remained a Wells Rich Greene client through 1968.

Lawrence was behind the Benson and Hedges marketing campaign in the late 1960s which increased the sales of Benson and Hedges from 1 billion cigarettes in 1966 to 14 billion cigarettes in 1970.

By 1969, Lawrence was reported to be the highest-paid executive in advertising. She was selected by U.S. Vice President Nelson Rockefeller to be a member of his Commission on Critical Choices for Americans, and was also invited by U.S. President Gerald Ford to represent business at an Economic Summit in Washington, D.C.

After Lawrence stepped down as CEO in 1990, the agency was sold to Boulet Dru Dupuy Petit, and became known as Wells Rich Greene BDDP. The agency officially ceased operations in 1998, and donated its archive of print and television ads to Duke University's John W. Hartman Center for Sales, Advertising and Marketing History.

Notable campaigns
A partial listing of Wells Rich Greene advertising campaigns:
 Plop plop, fizz fizz - Alka-Seltzer
 I Can't Believe I Ate the Whole Thing (winner of the 1971 Clio Award) - Alka-Seltzer
 Try it, you'll like it - Alka-Seltzer
 I ♥ N Y
 Trust the Midas touch
 At Ford, Quality is Job 1 
 Flick your Bic
 Raise your hand if you're Sure - Sure deodorant
 The “disadvantages” of a longer-than-King-size cigarette - Benson & Hedges 100's, cigarettes

Women on the Web
Mary Wells Lawrence is one of the five founders of wowOwow,  a website created, owned, and written by women for women, which launched on March 8, 2008, International Women's Day. The wOw founders are Joni Evans, Peggy Noonan, Liz Smith, Lesley Stahl, and Mary Wells Lawrence. The WOW contributors are Candice Bergen, Joan Juliet Buck, Joan Ganz Cooney, Joni Evans, Whoopi Goldberg, Judith Martin, Sheila Nevins, Peggy Noonan, Julia Reed, Liz Smith, Lesley Stahl, Marlo Thomas, Lily Tomlin, Jane Wagner, and Mary Wells Lawrence.

Honors

 Named one of the top ten newsmakers of the 1960s by Advertising Age.
 The youngest member to be inducted into the Copywriters Hall of Fame.
 Recipient of the Golden Plate Award of the American Academy of Achievement in 1969.
 Named the 1971 Advertising Woman of the Year by the American Advertising Federation.
 Inducted into the American Advertising Federation Hall of Fame in 1999.

Author
  Mary Wells Lawrence.  A Big Life in Advertising.  Hardcover: Alfred A. Knopf, 2002,   Paperback: Touchstone, 2003,

References

Further reading
 
 
 
 
 
 
 
 The Lady Who Got an Era.  Student thesis for Fall 1996 course in the Department of Advertising in the University of Texas at Austin College of Communication.  Copyright 1996, Youngseon Kim.  Thesis hosted online by the University's Center for Interactive Advertising (ciAd).

External links
 Braniff Flying Colors Historical Page
 Mary Wells Lawrence at wowOwow
 "Madison Avenue", BBC Adam Curtis blog discusses Wells' career and features a film about Braniff from 1967 in which Wells speaks.

1928 births
American advertising executives
Living people
Businesspeople from Youngstown, Ohio
Women in advertising